The chiral Potts model is a spin model on a planar lattice in statistical mechanics. As with the Potts model, each spin can take n=0,...N-1 values. To each pair of nearest neighbour of spins n and n', a Boltzmann weight W(n,n') (Boltzmann factor) is assigned. The model is chiral, meaning W(n,n')≠ W(n-n') and W(n,n')≠ W(n',n).  When its weights satisfy the Yang–Baxter equation, (star–triangle relation), it is integrable. For the integrable chiral Potts model, its weights are parametrized by a high genus curve, the chiral Potts curve.
Unlike the other solvable models, whose weights are parametrized by curves of genus less or equal to one, so that they can be expressed in term of trigonometric, or rational function (genus=0) or by theta functions (genus=1), this model involves high genus theta functions, which are not yet well developed. Therefore, it was thought that no progress could be made for such a difficult problem. Yet, many breakthroughs have been made since the 1990s. It must be stressed again that the chiral Potts model was not invented because it was integrable but the integrable case was found, after it was introduced to explain experimental data. In a very profound way physics is here far ahead of mathematics. The history and its development will be presented here briefly.

Note that the chiral clock model, which has been introduced in the 1980s, independently, by David Huse and Stellan Ostlund, is not exactly solvable, in contrast to the chiral Potts model.

The model 
This model is out of the class of all previously known models and raises a host of unsolved questions which are related to some of the most intractable problems of algebraic geometry which have been with us for 150 years. The chiral Potts models are used to understand the commensurate-incommensurate phase transitions. For N = 3 and 4, the integrable case was discovered in 1986 in Stony Brook and published the following year.

Self-dual case 
The model is called self-dual, if the Fourier transform of the weight is equal to the weight. A special (genus 1) case had been solved in 1982 by Fateev and Zamolodchikov.
By removing certain restrictions of the work of Alcaraz and Santos, a more general self-dual case of the integrable chiral Potts model was discovered. The weight are given in product form and the parameters in the weight are shown to be on the Fermat curve, with genus greater than 1.

General case 
In Canberra, the general solution for all k (the temperature variable) was found. The weights were also given in product form and it was tested by Fortran that they satisfy the star–triangle relation. The proof was published later.

Results

Order parameter 
From the series the order parameter is conjectured to have the simple form

It took many years to prove this conjecture, as the usual corner transfer matrix technique could not be used, because of the higher genus curve. This conjecture was finally proven by Baxter in 2005 using functional equations and the "broken rapidity line" technique of Jimbo et al. assuming two rather mild analyticity
conditions of the type commonly used in the field of Yang–Baxter integrable models. Most recently, in a series of papers
an algebraic (Ising-like) way of obtaining order parameter has been given, giving more insight into the algebraic structure.

Connection to 6-vertex model 
In 1990 Bazhanov and Stroganov show that there exist an 2 × N L-operators, which satisfy the Yang–Baxter equation

where 2 × 2 R-operator is the 6-vertex  R-matrix (see Vertex model). 
The product of four chiral Potts weight S was shown to intertwine two L-operators as

This inspired a most important breakthrough, namely the functional relations for the transfer matrices of the chiral Potts models are discovered.

Free energy and interfacial tension 
Using these functional relation, Baxter was able to calculate the eigenvalues of the transfer matrix of the chiral Potts model, and obtained the critical exponent for the specific heat α=1-2/N, which was also conjectured in reference 12. The interfacial tensions are also calculated by him with the exponent μ=1/2+1/N.

Relation with mathematics

Knot theory 
The integrable chiral Potts weights are given in product form  as

where ωN=1 and we associate with each of the rapidity variable p with three variables (xp,yp,μp) satisfying

It is easy to see that

which is similar to Reidemeister move I. It was also known that the weights satisfying the inversion relation,

This is equivalent to Reidemeister move II. The star-triangle relation

is equivalent to Reidemeister move III. These are shown in the figure shown here.

See also
 Z N model

References 

Lattice models
Spin models
Statistical mechanics